HR 1884 is a spectroscopic binary star in the constellation Auriga. The primary is a G type supergiant star while the secondary is probably a B type main sequence star.

The possible spectroscopic binary nature of the star was first noted in 1983 by Gilbert Burki and Michel Mayor in a paper on the rate of binaries among supergiant stars. In the same year, William P. Bidelman noted that the stellar spectrum was composite indicating a companion star. Confirmation of spectroscopic binary status and a preliminary orbit was published  in 1998 by R. Paul Butler, a much more accurate orbit was published in 2015 by Roger Griffin.

References

Auriga (constellation)
Durchmusterung objects
36891
1884
26363
Spectroscopic binaries
G-type supergiants
B-type main-sequence stars